Hrușca (Hrushka, Grushka) is a commune in the Camenca District of Transnistria, Moldova. It is composed of two villages, Frunzăuca (Фрунзівка, Фрунзовка) and Hrușca. It has since 1990 been administered as a part of the breakaway Pridnestrovian Moldavian Republic (PMR).

References

Communes of Transnistria
Camenca District